Myora Mission was established as a mission station in 1892 in the Colony of Queensland, at Moongalba on Stradbroke Island. It became an Aboriginal reserve and "industrial and reform school" in 1896, was used as a source of cheap labour, and eventually closed in 1943.

History

Failed mission, 1843
An earlier mission was established at Moongalba by Passionist priests under Archbishop Polding in 1843, but their attempts failed and they left the island not long afterwards.

Establishment, 1892
The Queensland Aboriginal Protection Association established the mission on the island and known as Minjerribah by the local Aboriginal people, the Quandamooka.

On the 26 November 1892, Myora Mission was proclaimed a "Reserve for Mission", signed by Queen Victoria. "Assimilation through institutionalisation" began from October 1893, with the staff enforcing European cultural practices and values. The Mission was declared an "industrial and reformatory school" and a Mission Superintendent and Mission Matron were appointed by QAPA, but paid by the Queensland Government.

The older boys and girls were trained to be "made useful and profitable to the mission and to society", and punished if they transgressed. The mission later ceased to be a school, the dormitories were closed, and the children classified as orphans and  removed to Deebing Creek Mission.

Aboriginal reserve, 1896
It was then  re-proclaimed a "Reserve for the use of the Aboriginal Inhabitants of the State" changing its official status from mission to Aboriginal reserve. The reserve came under the control of four Chief Protectors of Aborigines between 1897 (the year of the Aboriginals Protection and Restriction of the Sale of Opium Act 1897) and 1940.  By 1905, there were about 48 permanent residents at Moongalba, including five South Pacific Islander men married to local women. The residents were used as cheap or free labour at the Benevolent Institution, whose Medical ran the mission from 1906 to 1917, as well as the fish cannery, abattoir and the Moreton Bay Oyster Company. They also worked as nursing assistants, domestic servants and fishermen on the island.

Closure, 1943
Myora reserve closed in 1943, and the land was handed over to the Benevolent Institution. The residents were moved to Moopi Moopi Pa (One Mile) and Goompi (Dunwich). In 1947 the Benevolent Institution was moved to Sandgate, taking all of its amenities and opportunities for employment.

References

Australian Aboriginal missions
Aboriginal communities in Queensland
Stolen Generations institutions
Mission stations in Australia